The 2017–18 LNH Division 1 is the 66th season of the LNH Division 1, French premier handball league and the 41st season consisting of only one league. It runs from 13 September 2017 to 30 May 2018.

Team information 

The following 14 clubs compete in the LNH Division 1 during the 2017-18 season:

League table

Schedule and results
In the table below the home teams are listed on the left and the away teams along the top.

Season statistics

Top goalscorers

As of 30 May 2018

Monthly awards

References

External links
 Official site 

2017–18 domestic handball leagues
LNH Division 1
LNH Division 1